Albizzate-Solbiate Arno railway station is a railway station in Italy. Located on the Porto Ceresio–Milan railway, it serves the municipalities of Albizzate and Solbiate Arno.

Services 
The station is served by the line S5 of Milan suburban railway network, operated by the lombard railway company Trenord.

See also 
 Milan suburban railway network

References

External links 

Railway stations in Lombardy
Milan S Lines stations
Railway stations opened in 1865